was a weekly manga magazine published by Shogakukan in Japan since the first issue on March 27, 1987. It replaced Shōnen Big Comic in Shogakukan's lineup of shōnen titles, and many of the titles in Shōnen Big Comic were continued in Young Sunday. The magazines was sometimes called  for short.

To celebrate the 20th anniversary of Weekly Young Sunday, Shogakukan and Yahoo! Auctions Japan held a charity auction benefitting the Green Cross Japan. Various manga artists donated signed original artwork, and Shogakukan donated rare goods related to the series and people appearing in the magazine.

On May 30, 2008, Shogakukan announced that they would cease publication of the magazine. The final issue was released on July 31, 2008.

Ongoing titles in the final issue
Titles marked with * have had been adapted into a live action movie, TV drama series, or special. Titles marked with ** have had been adapted into an anime series, OVA, or movie. 
Aoi Honō, by Kazuhiko Shimamoto (not in every issue, began issue 14 in 2007)*
Ankoro by Daichi Banjou
Beach Stars by Masahiro Morio
Birdy the Mighty, by Masami Yuki (began issue 4/5 in 2003)*
Chō Mukiryoku Sentai Japa-Five by Masaki Satō
Cut: Katsuhito, by Tomomi Muronaga (began issue 16 in 2007)
Drive Alive by Kunihiko Nakai
Dr. Kotō Shinryōjo, by Takatoshi Yamada (began issue 29 in 2000)* **
Go-On! by Manabu Akisige
Hana no Miyako by Takashi Kondō
Idol Ace, by Mitsuru Adachi (not in every issue, began issue 36/37 in 2005)
Ikigami: The Ultimate Limit, by Motorō Mase (began issue 9 in 2005)
Kurosagi, by Kuromaru (created by Takeshi Tatsuhara, began issue 50 in 2003)**
Lost Man by Michiteru Kusaba
Ma Q Ken by Masahiko Kikuni
Miharu Rising by Miku Simai
Mogura no Uta by Noburu Takahashi
Odds, by Osamu Ishiwata (began issue 14 in 2006)
Oyasumi Punpun, by Inio Asano (began issue 15 in 2007)
Rainbow: Nisha Rokubō no Shichinin by George Abe and Masasumi Kakizaki (began in 2001) **
Sakuranbo Syndrome: Kupido no Itazura Nijidama II, by Taku Kitazaki (began issue 34 in 2006)
Shin Seishun-kun, by Yasutaka Togashi (began issue 1 in 2007)
Thanatos: Mushikera no Ken, by Shinji Takehara (writer) and Yūsuke Ochiai (artist) (began issue 1 in 2007)
Tōbō Bengoshi Narita Makoto by Yū Takada and Shiro Takahide
Tomehane! Suzuri Kōkō Shodōbu by Katsutoshi Kawai (began in 2007) *
Toritsu Mizusho! by Hikaru Murozumi and Shinobu Inokuma
Yami no Aegis by Kyoichi Nanatsuki and Yoshihide Fujiwara
Zetsubō ni Kiku Kusuri, by Reiji Yamada (began issue 38 in 2003)

YS Special
Of the series that were running in the magazine at the time of its cancellation, Birdy the Mighty, Ikigami The Ultimate Limit, Kurosagi, Lost Man, Mogura no Uta, Oyasumi Punpun, Rainbow Nisha Rokubō no Shichinin, and Tomehane! Suzuri Kōkō Shodōbu all moved to Big Comic Spirits. Big Comic Spirits itself began releasing a special supplementary issue entitled YS Special. The magazine's first issue debuted September 28, 2008 and allowed for the twelve remaining series running in Young Sunday at the time of its cancellation to conclude their storylines.

Of those twelve series, Chō Mukiryoku Sentai Japa-Five, Hana no Miyako, and Miharu Rising all ended in the third issue. Thanatos: Mushikera no Ken and Beach Stars ended in the fourth issue. The final seven; Sakuranbo Syndrome: Kupido no Itazura Nijidama II, The School of Water Business, Odds, Drive Alive, Go-On!, Ankoro, and Yami no Aegis all concluded in the final issue published in January 2009.

Concluded titles
These titles have concluded their runs in Weekly Young Sunday.
Angel, by U-Jin
Bakune Young, by Toyokazu Matsunaga
BUGS: Summer of Predators, by Kyoichi Nanatsuki & Yoshihide Fujiwara (2006–2007)
Captain Donkabe, by Hiroto Oishi
Cupid no Itazura Nijidama, by Taku Kitazaki
Fighting Beauty Wulong, by Yūgo Ishikawa ♥
Heartbroken Angels by 
Hikari no Sora, by Eiji Kazama
Hoshi no Furumachi, by Hidenori Hara
Ichi the Killer, by Hideo Yamamoto (May 1998 through 2001) ♣
Irasshāse., by Yūsuke Yoshida (began issue 21/22 in 2004)
Jimuin A-ko, by Hiroyuki Nishimori (began issue 14 in 2006)
Kakeru, by Kenjirō Takeshita (1997-?)
Karen Jogakiun Kōkō Danshi Kendōbu, by Kenji Morita (began issue 13 in 2007)
Lycanthrope Leo, by Kengo Kaji and Kenji Okamura
Odawara Dragon Quest!, by Dragon Odawara (began issue 7/8 in 2003)
O~i! Ryoma, by Yū Koyama and Tetsuya Takeda (1986–1996)
Okama Report, by Hideo Yamamoto
One-Pound Gospel, by Rumiko Takahashi (not in every issue, March 1987 - January 2007) ♥
Over Rev!, by Katsumi Yamaguchi (1997-2004) ♥
Portus, by Jun Abe
Sakura Diaries by U-Jin (1995–2000)
Seishun-kun, by Yasutaka Togashi (1989-?)
Sex, by Atsushi Kamijo (1988–1992)
Shimokita Glory Days, by Jiro Otani
Short Cuts, by Usamaru Furuya (1996-1999)
Short Program (various short stories), by Mitsuru Adachi (1987–1995)
Solanin by Inio Asano (2005-2006)
Tell Me A Lie, by Gosho Aoyama (2007)
TVO by Ochazukenori (1989–1990)
Voyeur by Hideo Yamamoto (1992)
Voyeurs, Inc. by Hideo Yamamoto (1993-1996)

References

External links
 Weekly Young Sunday (official site)
 Young Sunday Visual Web (official site, covers all the idol stars profiled in the magazine)

1987 establishments in Japan
2008 disestablishments in Japan
Defunct magazines published in Japan
Weekly manga magazines published in Japan
Magazines established in 1987
Magazines disestablished in 2008
Seinen manga magazines
Shogakukan magazines